In geometry, the elongated pentagonal cupola is one of the Johnson solids. As the name suggests, it can be constructed by elongating a pentagonal cupola by attaching a decagonal prism to its base. The solid can also be seen as an elongated pentagonal orthobicupola with its "lid" (another pentagonal cupola) removed.

Formulas
The following formulas for the volume and surface area can be used if all faces are regular, with edge length a:

Dual polyhedron 

The dual of the elongated pentagonal cupola has 25 faces: 10 isosceles triangles, 5 kites, and 10 quadrilaterals.

References

External links
 

Johnson solids